is a passenger railway station in the city of  Yotsukaidō, Chiba Prefecture, Japan, operated by the East Japan Railway Company (JR East).

Lines

Station layout
The station consists of two opposed side platforms connected to the station building by a footbridge. The station is staffed.

Platforms

History
After World War II, the JGR became the Japan National Railways (JNR). The station was absorbed into the JR East network upon the privatization of the Japan National Railways (JNR) on April 1, 1987. A new elevated station building was completed on April 12, 1998. The platforms were lengthened in 2004 to accommodate 15-carriage trains.

Passenger statistics
In fiscal 2009, the station was used by an average of 4163 passengers daily

Surrounding area
 Sakura Industrial Estate
Keiai University

See also
 List of railway stations in Japan

References

External links

 JR East station information 

Railway stations in Japan opened in 1937
Railway stations in Chiba Prefecture
Sōbu Main Line
Yotsukaidō